Rosaceous may refer to:

 The plant family Rosaceae
 The skin condition rosacea
 Rose (color)